Anubavam Pudhumai is a 1967 Indian Tamil-language comedy thriller film directed by C. V. Rajendran in his debut and written by Chitralaya Gopu from a story by Raju. The film stars R. Muthuraman and Rajasree. It was released on 2 March 1967. The film was remade in Hindi as Hulchul (1971).

Plot

Cast 
R. Muthuraman
Rajasree
T. R. Ramachandran
Major Sundarrajan
Manorama
T. S. Balaiah
V. S. Raghavan
R. S. Manohar
Senthamarai

Production 
Anubavam Pudhumai is the directorial debut of C. V. Rajendran. Cinematography was handled by P. N. Sundaram, and editing by N. M. Shankar.

Soundtrack 
Soundtrack was composed by M. S. Viswanathan.

Reception 

Kalki said the film was more than half-sweet. The film failed commercially.

References

External links 
 

1960s comedy thriller films
1960s Tamil-language films
1967 directorial debut films
1967 films
Films directed by C. V. Rajendran
Films scored by M. S. Viswanathan
Films with screenplays by Chitralaya Gopu
Indian comedy thriller films
Tamil films remade in other languages